Saigō may refer to:

Places 

 Saigō, Shimane
 Saigō, Miyazaki

People 

 Saigō-no-Tsubone (Lady Saigō) (1552–1589), consort of Tokugawa Ieyasu, the samurai lord and shōgun
 Saigō Takamori
 Saigō Tanomo
 Teruhiko Saigō
 Saigō Tsugumichi